Pierre Hevey (October 21, 1831 – March 21, 1910) was a Canadian-born American priest, and second pastor of Ste. Marie Church in Manchester, New Hampshire, in the early 20th century. He played a key role in the establishment of the first credit union in the United States on November 24, 1908, to help his parishioners save money and access credit at a reasonable cost.

Hevey was born on October 21, 1831, in Quebec, Canada. He died on March 21, 1910, in the McGregorville neighborhood of Manchester.

See also
History of credit unions
New Hampshire Historical Marker No. 208: St. Mary's Bank Credit Union / La Caisse Populaire Sainte-Marie

People
Attorney Joseph Boivin
Edward Filene
Alphonse Desjardins

Places
America's Credit Union Museum
Ste. Marie Church (Manchester, New Hampshire)
Sainte Marie Roman Catholic Church Parish Historic District

References

American Roman Catholic priests
American cooperative organizers
Credit unions of the United States
People from Manchester, New Hampshire
Catholics from New Hampshire
1831 births
1910 deaths